Vita, also known as Vite, is a city and a municipal council in Sangli district in the Indian state of Maharashtra. Vita is also taluka headquarters of Khanapur taluka.

Demographics
As of the 2011 Indian census, Vita had a population of 48,289, of which 24,692 were males and 23,597 were females. The population in the age group of 0 to 6 years was 5,321. The average literacy rate was 77.65% of which male literacy was 81.58% and the female literacy rate was 73.57%. Scheduled Castes and Scheduled Tribes have a population of 6,628 and 402 respectively. There were 10328 households in Vita in 2011.

Communication and media
Marathi is the main language. Hindi and English were also spoken, in addition to some community-specific languages.

Nearest cities

 Palus : 27km

 Tasgaon : 32km

 Karad : 42km

Swachh survekshan awards
Vita was ranked 9th in both the west zone and the state for Best City in 'Innovation & Best Practices' in 2020.

In the Swachh Survekshan Awards 2021, Vita ranked top in the cleanest city (in less than one lakh population category) of the India.

Tourist attractions
 Revansiddha Temple
 Dargoba Mandir, Pare
 Sagareshwar Wildlife Sanctuary kundal
 Sulkai Temple

References

Cities and towns in Sangli district